Isdud is a former Palestinian village and the site of the ancient and classical-era Levantine metropolis of Ashdod. The village, which had a population of 4,910 in 1945, was depopulated during the 1948 Arab-Israeli War. Today the ruins are located in the Be'er Tuvia region, 6 km southwest of the modern Israeli city of Ashdod. The archaeological site is known as Tel Ashdod, and remnants of the settlement's ancient and modern remains are visible.

The first documented urban settlement at Isdud dates to the 17th century BCE, when it was a fortified Canaanite city. It was destroyed at the end of the Late Bronze Age. During the Iron Age, it was a prominent Philistine city, one of the five Philistine city-states. It is mentioned 13 times in the Hebrew Bible. After being captured by Uzziah, it was briefly ruled by the Kingdom of Judah before it was taken by the Assyrians. During the Persian period, Nehemiah condemned the returning Jews for intermarrying Ashdod's residents. Under Hellenistic rule, the city was known as Azotus. It was later incorporated into the Hasmonean kingdom. During the 1st century BCE, Pompey removed the city from Judean rule and annexed it to the Roman province of Syria. Ashdod was a bishopric under Byzantine rule, but its importance gradually slipped and by the Middle Ages it was a village. 

Today, the site is an archaeological site open to the public, with visible remains of Isdud and earlier historical ruins, thought to be Philistine. The central village mosque stands at the top of the site, as does the khan and the tomb of Sheikh Abu Al-Kabel.

History

Bronze Age archaeology
The site of Isdud is today an archaeological tell known as "Tel Ashdod". It is a few km south of the modern Israel city of Ashdod. It was excavated by archaeologists in nine seasons between 1962 and 1972. The effort was led during the first few years by David Noel Freedman of the Pittsburgh Theological Seminary and Moshe Dothan. The remaining seasons were headed by Dothan for the Israel Antiquities Authority.

Middle Bronze
The earliest major habitation in Ashdod dates to the 17th century BCE. Ashdod was fortified in MBIIC with a two-entryway city gate (similar to Shechem).

Late Bronze
Ashdod is first mentioned in written documents from Late Bronze Age Ugarit, which indicate that the city was a center of export for dyed woolen purple fabric and garments. At the end of the 13th century BCE the Sea Peoples conquered and destroyed Ashdod. By the beginning of the 12th century BCE, the Philistines, generally thought to have been one of the Sea Peoples, ruled the city. During their reign, the city prospered and was a member of the Philistine Pentapolis (i.e. five cities), which included Ashkelon and Gaza on the coast and Ekron and Gath farther inland, in addition to Ashdod.

Iron Age

In 950 BCE Ashdod was destroyed during Pharaoh Siamun's conquest of the region. The city was not rebuilt until at least 815 BCE.

Asdûdu led the revolt of Philistines, Judeans, Edomites, and Moabites against Assyria after expulsion of king Ahimiti, whom Sargon had installed instead of his brother Azuri. Gath (Gimtu) belonged to the kingdom of Ashdod at that time. Assyrian king Sargon II's commander-in-chief (turtanu), whom the King James Bible calls simply "Tartan", regained control of Ashdod in 712/711 BCE and forced the usurper Yamani to flee. Sargon's general destroyed the city and exiled its residents, including some Israelites who were subsequently settled in Media and Elam.

Mitinti (Akkadian: 𒈪𒋾𒅔𒋾 mi-ti-in-ti; Philistine: 𐤌𐤕𐤕 *Mītīt or *Matīt) was king at the time of Sargon's son Sennacherib (r. 705–681 BCE), and Akhimilki in the reign of Sennacherib's son Esarhaddon (r. 681–669 BCE).

Psamtik I of Egypt (r. 664 – 610 BCE) is reported to have besieged the great city Azotus for twenty-nine years (Herodotus, ii. 157); the biblical references to the remnant of Ashdod (cf. ) are interpreted as allusions to this event.

The city absorbed another blow in 605 BCE, when Nebuchadnezzar of Babylonia conquered it.

In 539 BCE the city was rebuilt by the Persians. In 332 BCE it was conquered in the wars of Alexander the Great.

The Book of Nehemiah, referring to events in the 5th century BCE, mentions the Ashdodites and the speech of Ashdod, which half of the children from mixed families are described as adopting. Hugo Winckler explains the use of that name by the fact that Ashdod was the nearest of the Philistine cities to Jerusalem.

In the Hebrew Bible
There are Biblical episodes referencing Ashdod but they remain uncorroborated by archaeological finds:

 Upon Joshua's conquest of the Promised Land, Ashdod was allotted to the Tribe of Judah (Book of Joshua 15:46).
 In I Samuel 6:17 Ashdod is mentioned among the principal Philistine cities. After capturing the Ark of the covenant from the Israelites, the Philistines took it to Ashdod and placed it in the temple of Dagon. The next morning Dagon was found prostrate before the Ark; on being restored to his place, he was on the following morning again found prostrate and broken. The people of Ashdod were smitten with boils; a plague of mice was sent over the land (1 Samuel 6:5).
 According to the Bible, during the 10th century BCE Ashdod became, along with all the kingdom of Philistia, a patronage area of the Kingdom of Israel under the control of King David.
 The capture of the city by King Uzziah of Judah shortly after 815 BCE is mentioned within 2 Chronicles (26:6) and in the Book of Zechariah (9:6), speaking of the false Jews.
 In the Book of Nehemiah, some 5th century BCE residents of Jerusalem are said to have married women from Ashdod, and half of the children of these unions were reportedly unable to understand Hebrew; instead, they spoke "the language of Ashdod".

Hellenistic period

Once Hellenised, the city changed its name to the more Greek-sounding Αzotus ( and prospered until the Hasmonean Revolt. During the rebellion Judas Maccabeus "took it, and laid it waste" (Antiquities of the Jews Book 12, 8:6) His brother Jonathan conquered it again in 147 BCE and destroyed the temple of Dagon of biblical fame (Antiquities Book 13, 4:4). During the rule of Alexander Jannæus, Ashdod was part of his territory (Antiquities Book 13, 15:4).

Roman period
After the destruction wreaked during the succession wars between Hyrcanus II and Aristobulus II, Pompey restored the independence of Azotus, as he did with all Hellenising coastal cities (Antiquities Book 14, 4:4). A few years later, in 55 BCE, after more fighting, Roman general Gabinius helped rebuild Ashdod and several other cities left without protective walls (Antiquities Book 14, 5:2). In 30 BCE Ashdod came under the rule of King Herod, who then bequeathed it to his sister Salome (Antiquities Book 17, 8:1). By the time of the First Jewish–Roman War (66-70), there must have been a large enough Jewish presence in Ashdod for Vespasian to feel compelled to place a garrison in the city.

Despite its location four miles (6 km) from the coast, Ptolemy (c. 90 – c. 168 CE) described it as a maritime city, as did Josephus in Antiquities Book 13, 15:4. The same Josephus though describes Ashdod as "in the inland parts" (Antiquities Book 14, 4:4). This curious contradiction may refer to Ashdod's control of a separate harbor, called Azotus Paralios, or Ashdod-on-the-Sea (παράλιος - "paralios", Greek for "on the coast"). The landlocked city was called by the Romans Hippinos, "of the horsemen", and by the Greeks until late in the medieval period, Azotus mesogaios or "inland Azotus".

In the New Testament
The 1st century CE Book of Acts refers to Azotus as the place in which Philip the Evangelist reappeared after he converted the Ethiopian eunuch to Christianity. Philip preached the gospel throughout the area until he reached Caesarea, about 90 km to the north.

Byzantine, Crusader, Ayyubid and Mamluk periods
During the Byzantine period, Ashdod-Yam overshadowed its inland counterpart in size and importance. The 6th-century Madaba Map shows both under their respective names.

The prominence of Hellenised, then Christian Azotus continued until the 7th century, when it came under Muslim rule. The city was represented at the Council of Chalcedon by Heraclius of Azotus.

The geographer Ibn Khordadbeh (c. 820 – 912) referred to the inland city as "Azdud" and described it as a postal station between al-Ramla and Gaza.

The port stops being mentioned during the Ayyubid and Mamluk periods, making it likely that it was destroyed by the Muslims along with the other port cities, due to fears that they might again be used by Crusader invasions from the sea.<ref name=Petersen>Andrew Petersen, The Towns of Palestine under Muslim Rule: AD 600-1600 ", BAR International Series 1381, 2005, pp. 90 -91</ref> With the destruction of the port city, its inland counterpart regains its importance.

Ottoman period

The location of the village on Via Maris enhanced the city's importance during the Ottoman rule. In 1596 CE, administrated by nahiya ("subdistrict") of Gaza under the liwa' ("district") of Gaza, the population of Ashdod (named Sdud) numbered 75 households, about 413 persons, all Muslims. The villagers paid a  fixed tax rate of 33,3% on wheat, barley, sesame and fruit crops, as well as goats and beehives; a total of 14,000 Akçe.

In 1838, Esdud was noted as a Muslim village in the  Gaza district.Robinson and Smith, 1841, vol 2, p. 368 

In the late nineteenth century, Isdud was described as a village spread across the eastern slope of a low hill, covered with gardens. A ruined khan stood southwest of the village. Its houses were one-storey high with walls and enclosures built of adobe brick. There were two main sources of water: a pond and a masonry well. Both were surrounded by groves of date-palm and fig-trees.

British Mandate
In the 1922 census of Palestine, conducted by the British Mandate authorities, Isdud had a population of 2,566 inhabitants; 2,555 Muslims and 11 Christians, where the Christians were all Catholics. The population increased in the 1931 census to 3,240; 3,238 Muslims and 2 Christians, in a total of 764 houses.

During the Mandatory period, Isdud had two elementary schools; one for boys which was opened in 1922, and one for girls which started in 1942. By the mid-1940s the boy-school had 371 students, while the girl-school had 74.

The official Village Statistics, 1945 for "Isdûd" gave a population of 4,620 Arabs and 290 Jews in a total land area of 47,871 dunams [].Government of Palestine, Department of Statistics. Village Statistics, April, 1945. Quoted in Hadawi, 1970, p. 45  Of this, 3,277 dunams were used citrus and bananas, 8,327 for plantations and irrigable land, 23,762 for cereals, while 131 dunams were built-on land.

1948 War 

The village of Isdud was occupied by the Egyptian army on May 29, 1948, and became the Egyptians' northernmost position during the 1948 Arab-Israeli War. While the Israelis failed to capture territory, and suffered heavy casualties, Egypt changed its strategy from offensive to defensive, thus halting their advance northwards. Egyptian and Israeli forces clashed in the surrounding area, with the Egyptians being unable to hold the Ad Halom bridge over the Lachish River. Israeli forces surrounded the town during Operation Pleshet, and shelled and bombed it from the air. For three nights from 18 October the Israeli Air Force bombed Isdud and several other locations. Fearing encirclement, Egyptian forces retreated on October 28, 1948, and the majority of the residents fled. The 300 townspeople who remained were driven southwards by the Israel Defense Forces.Morris, 2004, p.471 The village was part of territory that was granted to Israel in the 1949 Armistice Agreements following the end of the war.

Modern period
In 1950, two moshavim, Sde Uziyahu and Shtulim, were established to the east of Isdud, on village land.

According to Khalidi, the site of Isdud is now covered in sand dunes.

Gallery

See also
List of Arab towns and villages depopulated during the 1948 Arab-Israeli War

References

Bibliography

Nasser, Gamal Abdul (1955/1973):  "Memoirs" in Journal of Palestine Studies" “Memoirs of the First Palestine War” in 2, no. 2 (Win. 73): 3-32, pdf-file, downloadable     
Petersen, Andrew (2002): A Gazetteer of Buildings in Muslim Palestine: Volume I (British Academy Monographs in Archaeology)'' (Isdud, p. 155-158)
 (Isdud: p.124)

External links
Welcome To Isdud
Isdud from the Khalil Sakakini Cultural Center
Tour and signposting in Isdud, by Eitan Bronstein, 15.8.03, Zochrot
Untold stories: Ahmad Joudah IMEU, Apr 24, 2008

District of Gaza
Arab villages depopulated during the 1948 Arab–Israeli War
Ashdod